The Sweden women's national American football team is the official American football senior national team of Sweden.

History 
The team competed at the 2013 IFAF Women's World Championship, where they finished fifth after beating Spain 64–0.

During the 2019 European Championship the team earned a silver medal, while Finland won the tournament.

References 

Women's national American football teams
American football
American football in Sweden